Bill Shirey (born February 28, 1932) is a retired NASCAR Winston Cup Series driver.

Career
He started 24th on average and also finished an average of 24th place. Shirey attempted to qualify for the 1971 Daytona 500 and the 1972 Miller High Life 500 but failed. His total earnings from his NASCAR career were $30,395 ($ when adjusted for inflation).

Compared to his meager career earnings, today's NASCAR Sprint Cup Series stars are generally considered to be multimillionaires after their first full-time schedule. Shirey was a driver/owner for most of the races with occasional employment under former NASCAR owners Dub Clewis, John Keselowski, and David Ray Boggs. While disqualifications are rare in NASCAR, Shirey was handed a disqualification at the 1972 Northern 300 racing event that took place in Trenton International Speedway.

Motorsports career results

NASCAR
(key) (Bold – Pole position awarded by qualifying time. Italics – Pole position earned by points standings or practice time. * – Most laps led.)

Grand National Series

Winston Cup Series

References

1932 births
Living people
NASCAR drivers
NASCAR team owners
Racing drivers from Detroit